Iljo Keisse (born 21 December 1982) is a Belgian former racing cyclist, who competed as a professional from 2005 to 2022. Keisse races on the track and on the road, specializing himself until recently in riding six-day races. He notably has won the Six Days of Ghent seven times and reached the podium a total of 12 times.

Biography
Keisse was born in Ghent. Together with his teammate Matthew Gilmore, he won three Six-day races in 2005–2006: Grenoble, Ghent and Hasselt. After his victory in the 2008 Six Days of Ghent, both his A and B samples tested positive for cathine and a diuretic which has been used to mask the presence of doping agents. He was fired by his team  on 11 January 2009.
He joined the John Saey-Deschacht-Hyundai team in May 2009.

On 2 November 2009, Keisse was cleared of any wrongdoing, with investigators finding that the positives were not the result of intentional doping and likely resulted from a contaminated dietary supplement. On 7 July 2010, the Court of Arbitration for Sport upheld an appeal by the World Anti-Doping Agency and reinstated Keisse's ban. He is credited for the 11 months he already sat out, meaning he was eligible to return to competition in August 2011. In November, the CAS' decision was overturned by the Belgian Court of Appeals, allowing Keisse to ride the 2010 Six Days of Ghent.

On 28 April 2012, Keisse won Stage 7 of the Tour of Turkey in dramatic fashion. After leaving the rest of a seven-man breakaway, Keisse crashed on the final corner. He remounted his bike, realized his chain was off, restrung it, and held off the chasing peloton by three bike lengths in a sprint for the line. The first chasers were given the same time as his. This was the first professional win of his career and his last for over two years. His next victory was in the Châteauroux Classic in August 2014. Another win came in 2015, at the Ronde van Zeeland Seaports; he won this race from a group of three  riders who had escaped earlier. In the Giro d'Italia, Keisse won the last stage in Milan, upsetting the sprinters' plans. He got clear with 's Luke Durbridge and outsprinted him for the victory.

Keisse announced during the 2022 season that he would retire and that his final race would be the Gent Six. Racing alongside Jasper De Buyst, he finished during his 18th and final appearance 3rd.

Major results

Road

2004
 1st Stage 6 Tour du Loir-et-Cher
 5th Overall Le Triptyque des Monts et Châteaux
2005
 9th Bruxelles–Ingooigem
2006
 4th Flèche Hesbignonne
 6th Overall Tour of Britain
 9th Overall Tour de Wallonie
2007
 1st Textielprijs Vichte
 3rd Kuurne–Brussels–Kuurne
 7th Halle–Ingooigem
 8th Omloop van het Waasland
2008
 1st Textielprijs Vichte
 4th GP Briek Schotte
2011
 10th Dutch Food Valley Classic
2012
 1st Stage 7 Tour of Turkey
2013
 1st Omloop Mandel-Leie-Schelde
 3rd Münsterland Giro
2014
 1st Châteauroux Classic
 2nd GP Briek Schotte
2015
 1st Ronde van Zeeland Seaports
 1st Profronde Deurne
 1st Stage 21 Giro d'Italia
 1st Stage 1 (TTT) Czech Cycling Tour
  Combativity award Stage 5 Vuelta a España
2017
 1st Omloop Mandel-Leie-Schelde
 1st Textielprijs Vichte
 3rd Le Samyn
 3rd Halle–Ingooigem
 10th Dwars door West-Vlaanderen
2020
 2nd Road race, National Championships

Grand Tour general classification results timeline

Track

2004
 2nd Six Days of Ghent (with Andreas Beikirch)
 2nd Six Days of Fiorenzuola (with Franco Marvulli)
 3rd Six Days of Grenoble (with Wouter Van Mechelen)
2005
 1st  Madison (with Matthew Gilmore), UEC European Championships
 1st Six Days of Fiorenzuola (with Matthew Gilmore)
 1st Six Days of Grenoble (with Matthew Gilmore)
 1st Six Days of Ghent (with Matthew Gilmore)
 3rd  Madison (with Matthew Gilmore), UCI World Championships
 3rd Six Days of Amsterdam (with Matthew Gilmore)
 3rd Six Days of Bremen (with Marco Villa)
2006
 1st  Derny, UEC European Championships
 1st  Points race, National Championships
 1st Six Days of Hasselt (with Matthew Gilmore)
 2nd Six Days of Stuttgart (with Robert Bartko & Leif Lampater)
 2nd Six Days of Zürich (with Robert Bartko)
 2nd Six Days of Rotterdam (with Matthew Gilmore)
 2nd Six Days of Munich (with Franco Marvulli)
2007
 1st Six Days of Rotterdam (with Robert Bartko)
 1st Six Days of Ghent (with Robert Bartko)
 1st Six Days of Amsterdam (with Robert Bartko)
 2nd  Points race, UCI World Championships
 2nd Six Days of Maastricht (with Marco Villa)
 2nd Six Days of Zürich (with Robert Bartko)
 2nd Six Days of Munich (with Franco Marvulli)
 2nd Six Days of Hasselt (with Marco Villa)
 3rd Six Days of Bremen (with Robert Bartko)
2008
 1st  Madison (with Kenny De Ketele), UEC European Championships
 National Championships
1st  Points race
1st  Madison (with Kenny De Ketele)
 1st Six Days of Stuttgart (with Robert Bartko & Leif Lampater)
 1st Six Days of Bremen (with Robert Bartko)
 1st Six Days of Ghent (with Robert Bartko)
 1st Six Days of Munich (with Robert Bartko)
 2nd Six Days of Zürich (with Robert Bartko)
 2nd Six Days of Hasselt (with Kenny De Ketele)
 2nd Six Days of Fiorenzuola (with Franco Marvulli)
 3rd Six Days of Amsterdam (with Robert Bartko)
 3rd Six Days of Copenhagen (with Danny Stam)
 3rd Six Days of Rotterdam (with Robert Bartko)
2009
 National Championships
1st  Points race
1st  Madison (with Kenny De Ketele)
 2nd Six Days of Ghent (with Roger Kluge)
 3rd Six Days of Grenoble (with Gianni Meersman)
2010
 1st Six Days of Ghent (with Peter Schep)
 1st Six Days of Rotterdam (with Danny Stam)
 2nd Six Days of Bremen (with Robert Bartko)
 2nd Six Days of Copenhagen (with Robert Bartko)
2011
 1st  Madison (with Kenny De Ketele), UEC European Championships
 National Championships
1st  Derny
1st  Madison (with Gert-Jan Van Immerseel)
1st  Scratch
 1st Six Days of Amsterdam (with Niki Terpstra)
 1st Six Days of Grenoble (with Morgan Kneisky)
 1st Six Days of Zürich (with Franco Marvulli)
2012
 1st Six Days of Ghent (with Glenn O'Shea)
 1st Six Days of Grenoble (with Kenny De Ketele)
 1st Six Days of Copenhagen (with Marc Hester)
 2nd Six Days of Amsterdam (with Niki Terpstra)
 3rd Six Days of Bremen (with Leif Lampater)
 3rd Six Days of Berlin (with Kenny De Ketele)
2013
 1st Six Days of Rotterdam (with Niki Terpstra)
 1st Six Days of Zürich (with Silvan Dillier)
 2nd Six Days of Ghent (with Wim Stroetinga)
 3rd Six Days of Grenoble (with Jasper De Buyst)
2014
 National Championships
1st  Madison (with Jasper De Buyst)
1st  Scratch
 1st Six Days of Rotterdam (with Niki Terpstra)
 1st Six Days of Zürich (with Mark Cavendish)
 2nd Six Days of Ghent (with Mark Cavendish)
2015
 1st Six Days of Ghent (with Michael Mørkøv)
 1st Six Days of Rotterdam (with Niki Terpstra)
 1st Revolution Round 2 (with Andy Tennant)
 1st Revolution Round 3 (with Wim Stroetinga)
1st Points race
1st Team elimination
 3rd Six Days of London (with Gijs Van Hoecke)
2016
 2nd Overall Revolution Champions League
 3rd Six Days of Ghent (with Elia Viviani)
2017
 1st Six Days of Bremen (with Marcel Kalz)
2018
 1st Six Days of Ghent (with Elia Viviani)
2019
 1st Six Days of Bremen (with Jasper De Buyst)
2022
 3rd Six Days of Ghent (with Jasper De Buyst)

Six Days results timeline

References

External links

Official website from Iljo Keisse and Matthew Gilmore

Belgian male cyclists
Belgian track cyclists
Living people
1982 births
Sportspeople from Ghent
Cyclists from East Flanders
Cyclists at the 2004 Summer Olympics
Cyclists at the 2008 Summer Olympics
Olympic cyclists of Belgium
Presidential Cycling Tour of Turkey stage winners
Doping cases in cycling
Belgian sportspeople in doping cases
Belgian Giro d'Italia stage winners
21st-century Belgian people